The Bola de Ouro (Golden Ball) is an annual award given each year, since 1973, by Brazilian sports magazine Placar to the best player in the Campeonato Brasileiro. A group of sports journalists watch every match of the competition and rate players 1 to 10 based on their performance. At the end of the season, the players with the best average rating in each position are awarded the Bola de Prata (Silver Ball), and the player with the best overall average rating is the recipient of the Bola de Ouro.

The awards were first given in 1973, but since the 1970 Campeonato Brasileiro Série A the magazine had started to evaluate players. The 1971 winner, Dirceu Lopes, received the award in the 2013 edition. Since the 1975 edition Placar also started to award a Bola de Prata to the top goalscorer of the competition. The players with most Bola de Ouro wins are Falcão, Toninho Cerezo, Zico, Roberto Costa and César Sampaio, each of them having won the award twice.

Both Pelé and Neymar were declared hors concours, not being allowed to participate due to being unrivaled by any other player. Pelé was declared as such in 1970, receiving then a Golden Ball in a year with no other Golden Ball awarded, although Francisco Reyes would have been that years recipient. Neymar was awarded his first Golden Ball in 2011 but later declared unrivaled, not being able to repeat his feat. They remain the only players with such honor.

From 2016 onwards, the award was organized by ESPN.

Winners

The award was not originally given from 1970 to 1972, but the following players had the best evaluation:

Players with multiple awards

Wins by club

Bola de Prata
Bola de Prata (Silver Ball) is given to the best players in their respective position (forward, defender, etc.) on the same points system. Therefore, the Brazilian team of the year is created. In 1973, Placar introduced the "Bola de Ouro", given to the best player of the league, according to Placar itself. In this year, two players shared the Bola de Ouro, this situation never occurred again. Players marked bold won the "Bola de Ouro" in that respective year.

Most appearances

Additional categories
In 1975, Placar started giving the Bola de Prata to the league's top scorer.

Foreign players awarded

Notes

 The Prêmio Craque do Brasileirão was first established in 2005.

Women's football
From the 2021 season onwards, the Bola de Ouro (Golden Ball) and Bola de Prata (Silver Ball) awards were given for the best players of the Campeonato Brasileiro de Futebol Feminino Série A1, using the same criteria as of for male players.

Bola de Ouro

Bola de Prata

Most appearances

Additional categories

References

External links 
 Silver Ball " Bola de Prata Placar Magazine
 Bola de Ouro (Placar Magazine)
 Bola de Prata (Placar Magazine)

Brazilian football trophies and awards
Campeonato Brasileiro Série A
1973 establishments in Brazil
Awards established in 1973
Awards by magazines
Annual events in Brazil